Takatsuki may refer to:
 Takatsuki, Osaka, a city in Osaka Prefecture, Japan
 Takatsuki Station (Osaka), a railway station
 Takatsuki, Shiga, a former town in Shiga Prefecture, Japan
 Takatsuki Station (Shiga), a railway station
 , a class of vessels of the Japan Maritime Self-Defense Force
 , lead ship of the class